Nils Olof "Olle" Fabian Sarri (born 20 January 1972) is a Swedish actor. His mother Inga Sarri was also an actress.

Filmography

Films
1989 - The Journey to Melonia
1996 - Monopol
1997 - Välkommen till festen
2000 - Together
2001 - Om inte
2006 - Kidz in da Hood
2009 - The Ape
2010 - Äntligen Midsommar
2016 - Sami Blood

Television
 1978 - Olles mammas morbror
 1998–2003 - c/o Segemyhr
 2002 - Heja Björn
 2020 - We got this
 2021 -  Snabba Cash

References

External links

1972 births
Living people
Swedish comedians
Swedish male actors
Swedish Sámi people